Resistencia Sport Club, is a Paraguayan football club based in Barrio Ricardo Brugada in Asunción. The club, founded on December 27, 1917, plays in the Primera División of the Paraguayan football league. Resistencia S.C. plays its home matches at the Tomás Beggan Correa Stadium.

Honours
Paraguayan Second Division: 4
1966, 1975, 1980, 1998
Paraguayan Third Division: (runner-up) 1
2011

References

External links
Resistencia SC Info

Resistencia
Resistencia
Association football clubs established in 1917
1917 establishments in Paraguay